Galit (גלית) is a given name which may refer to:

 Galit Atlas (born 1971), Israeli-American psychoanalyst
 Galit Chait (born 1975), Israeli ice dancer
 Galit Dahan-Carlibach (born 1981), Israeli author
 Galit Devash (born 1986), Israeli volleyball player
 Galit Eilat (born 1965), Israeli curator and writer
 Galit Gutmann (born 1972), Israeli actor and fashion model
 Galit Hasan-Rokem (born 1945), professor of folklore at the Hebrew University of Jerusalem
 Galit Lahav (born 1973), Israeli-American Professor of Systems Biology at Harvard Medical School
 Galit Ronen (born 1969), Israeli diplomat

Hebrew feminine given names